Nicola Sala (7 April 1713 – 31 August 1801) was an Italian composer and music theorist. He was born in Tocco Caudio and died in Naples. He was chapel-master and professor at Naples, having devoted himself to the collection of the finest models of printed music.

Biography 
Sala studied music in Naples at Conservatorio della Pietà dei Turchini from 1732 to 1740 under Nicola Fago and Leonardo Leo. Some of his pupils were Carlo Lenzi, Giuseppe Gherardeschi, Benedetto Neri, Étienne-Joseph Floquet, Adalbert Gyrowetz, Louis Julien Casels de Labarre, Ercole Paganini, Gaspare Spontini, and many others.

He probably wrote his first composition, the opera Vologeso, staged first in Rome, in 1737. In 1745 he was accepted as successor to Leo in the position of master of the royal chapel. In the sixties represented some of his works at the Teatro di San Carlo, including the drama Zenobia, composed by his pupil Ambrogio Minoja, was well received. In 1787 he became second master of the Pieta Turchini, where he stayed for 47 years as teacher and director of the conservatory.

He was one of the most important Neapolitan teachers, having taught many musical composers. He wrote several pedagogical treatises, including Regole del contrappunto pratico, published in Naples in 1794. He also wrote several operas, oratorios, masses and cantatas. His music was recently rediscovered by the Conservatory of Benevento, which has headed the institution and the local association Eufoniarché, producing his operas and oratorios each year with the help of palaeographers and Latin scholars of the University of Naples, Rome and Paris.

The well-regarded state-funded music conservatory Conservatorio Statale di Musica Nicola Sala in Benevento near Naples is named for him.

Selected works

Operas
Vologeso (opera seria, libretto by Apostolo Zeno, 1737, Rome)
La Zenobia (opera seria, libretto by Pietro Metastasio, 1761, Naples)
Demetrio (opera seria, libretto by Pietro Metastasio, 1762, Naples)
Merope (opera seria, libretto by Apostolo Zeno, 1769, Naples)

Other musical works
Giove, Pallade, Apollo (cantata, 1763, Naples)Il giudizio d'Apollo (serenade, libretto by Giovanni Fenizia, 1768, Naples)Erto, Ebone, Arminio (cantata, 1769, Naples)La bella eroina (prologue, 1769, Naples)
Varie ariaJudith seu Bethuliae liberatio-Giuditta ossia La Betulia liberata (oratorio, libretto by anonymous author, 2007, Benevento)

Theoretical worksRegole del contrappunto pratico (1794, Naples)Principi di contrappuntoElementi per ben suonare il cembaloDisposizione a tre per introduzione alle fughe di tre partiIl modo di disporre a tre sopra la scala diatonicaDisposizioni imitate a soggetto e contrasoggettoFughe con soggetto e contrasoggetto a suono plagaleReferences
 Peter van Tour: Counterpoint and Partimento: Methods of Teaching Composition in Late Eighteenth-Century Naples. 2015. 318p. (Studia musicologica Upsaliensia, 0081-6744 ; 25) , chapter 6.2: "The Teaching of Nicola Sala" .
 Peter van Tour (ed.), The 189 Partimenti of Nicola Sala: Complete Edition with Critical Commentary (Three volumes, 415 pp. Two printed volumes [352 pp.], the third volume is the Critical Commentary [63 pp.]). Edited by Peter van Tour. (Uppsala: Acta Universitatis Upsaliensis. Studia Musicologica Upsaliensia. Nova Series 27a–c, 2017). .

AttributionThis article is based on the translation of the corresponding article of the Italian Wikipedia. A list of contributors can be found there at the History section.''

1713 births
1801 deaths
18th-century Italian musicians
18th-century Italian male musicians
Italian classical composers
Italian male classical composers
Italian opera composers
Male opera composers
People from the Province of Benevento